Raglius confusus is a species of true bugs belonging to the family Rhyparochromidae.

Distribution
This species is present in most of southern Europe (Albania, Austria, Bulgaria, Croatia, Czech Republic, European Turkey, France, Germany, Greece, Hungary, Italy, North Macedonia, Northwest European Russia, Romania, Slovakia, Slovenia, Spain, Switzerland, Luxembourg and Poland).

Description
These small true bugs have distinctive markings of black-on-tan. The head and scutellum are black, while pronotum shows a large black band and a band of stippled brown, with two black spots. Elytra are brown, with two black markings. Membrane is black with a white spot. Hind femora along the lower surface have a row of straight, thin denticles.

Bibliography
 Reuter, O.M. 1886. Rev. Ent., Caen. 5:121 
 Reuter, O.M. 1888. Acta. Soc. Sci. fenn. 1, 2 15:(1)241-315; (2)443-812 
 Slater, J.A. 1964. A Catalogue of the Lygaeidae of the World. 1317–8; 1461

References

External links
 Barry.fotopage
 Hémiptères du Gard

Lygaeoidea
Hemiptera of Europe
Insects described in 1886